Reflected: Greatest Hits Vol. 2 is the second compilation album by American country music singer Tim McGraw, the first having been released in 2000. It was released on March 28, 2006.

Most of the tracks were recorded after the release of Greatest Hits, with the addition of two pre-2000 hits that were not on the first album — the No. 1 hits "Not a Moment Too Soon" (1994) and "Everywhere" (1997) — and four new tracks.

The album entered U.S. Billboard 200 chart at number two, selling about 242,000 copies in its first week. It entered Billboard's Top Country Albums chart at number one. On November 14, 2007, the album was certified 2× Platinum in the US.

Track listing

A - Previously unreleased.
B - Featured in the movie Flicka.

Personnel
On newly recorded tracks only.
Dean Brown – fiddle
David Campbell – string arrangements
David Dunkley – percussion
Denny Hemingson – steel guitar
Billy Mason – drums
John Marcus – bass guitar
Tim McGraw – lead vocals
Jeff McMahon – keyboards
Bob Miner – acoustic guitar
Darran Smith – electric guitar

Charts
Reflected: Greatest Hits Vol. 2 entered the US Billboard 200 chart at number two, his ninth top ten debut, and entered the Top Country Albums chart at number one, his eighth number one.

Weekly charts

Year-end charts

Sales and certifications

References

2006 greatest hits albums
Tim McGraw albums
Curb Records compilation albums
Albums produced by Byron Gallimore
Albums produced by Tim McGraw